Newcastle Port Corporation may refer to:

 the Port of Newcastle, Australia
 the Newcastle Port Corporation, New South Wales which was amalgamated into the Port Authority of New South Wales
 the Port of Tyne, near Newcastle upon Tyne, United Kingdom